Pictou was a provincial electoral district in Nova Scotia, Canada, that, at the time of its dissolution, elected two members to the Nova Scotia House of Assembly. It existed from 1867 to 1949, at which time Pictou County was divided into the three electoral districts of: Pictou East, Pictou West, and Pictou Centre.

Members of the Legislative Assembly 
Pictou elected the following members to the Legislature: 

Prior to 1933, Pictou elected three members to the Nova Scotia Legislature:

Election results

1867 general election

1871 general election

1874 general election

1878 general election

1882 general election

1886 general election

1890 general election

1894 general election

1897 general election

1901 general election

1906 general election

1911 general election

1916 general election

1920 general election

1925 general election

1928 general election

1933 general election

1937 general election

1941 general election

1945 general election

References

Former provincial electoral districts of Nova Scotia